Asota is a genus of moths in the family Erebidae first described by Jacob Hübner in 1819. Species are widely distributed throughout Africa, India, Sri Lanka, Myanmar, the Malayan region and tropical parts of the Australian region.

Description
Palpi upturned, where the second joint reaching the vertex of the head and the third joint is slender in variable lengths. Antennae fasciculated (bundled) in males and ciliated (hairy) in females. Forewings with vein 5 from the lower angle of cell or just above it. Vein 6 from the upper angle or below it. Areole absent. Hindwings with vein 5 from just above lower angle of cell. Veins 6 and 7 from the upper angle.

Taxonomy
The genus was formerly placed in the families Noctuidae and Arctiidae by some authors. Other authors placed them in the family Aganaidae or Hypsidae. Recent phylogenetic studies have shown that the Aganainae are most closely related to the Herminiinae (litter moths), and this pair of subfamilies is most closely related to the Arctiinae (tiger and lichen moths), all within the family Erebidae.

Species

 Asota albiformis Swinhoe, 1892
 Asota albivena Walker, 1864
 Asota alienata Walker, 1864
 Asota antennalis Rothschild, 1897
 Asota australis Boisduval, 1832
 Asota avacta Swinhoe, 1892
 Asota borbonica Boisduval, 1833
 Asota brunnescens Nieuwenhuis, 1948
 Asota buruensis Zwier, 2010
 Asota caledonica Holloway, 1979
 Asota canaraica Moore, 1878
 Asota caricae Fabricius, 1775
 Asota carsina Swinhoe, 1906
 Asota chionea Mabille, 1878
 Asota circularis Reich, 1938
 Asota clara Butler, 1875
 Asota comorana Aurivillius, 1909
 Asota concinnula Mabille, 1878
 Asota concolora Swinhoe, 1903
 Asota contorta Aurivillius, 1894
 Asota darsania Druce, 1894
 Asota diana Butler, 1887
 Asota diastropha Prout, 1918
 Asota dohertyi Rothschild, 1897
 Asota egens (Walker, 1854)
 Asota eusemioides Felder, 1874
 Asota fereunicolor Toulgoët, 1972
 Asota ficus Fabricius, 1775
 Asota fulvia Donovan, 1805
 Asota heliconia (Linnaeus, 1758)
 Asota heliconioides Moore, 1878
 Asota iodamia Herrich Schäffer, 1854
 Asota isthmia Walker, 1856
 Asota javana Cramer, [1780]
 Asota kageri Kobes, 1988
 Asota kinabaluensis Rothschild, 1896
 Asota orbona Vollenhoven, 1863
 Asota paliura Swinhoe, 1893
 Asota paphos (Fabricius, 1787)
 Asota plagiata Walker, 1854
 Asota plaginota Butler, 1875
 Asota plana Walker, 1854
 Asota producta (Butler, 1875)
 Asota sericea Moore, 1878
 Asota spadix Swinhoe, 1901
 Asota speciosa Drury, 1773
 Asota strigosa Boisduval, 1832
 Asota sulamangoliensis Zwier, 2010
 Asota subsimilis Walker, 1864
 Asota suffusa Snellen, 1891
 Asota sulawesiensis Zwier, 2007
 Asota tigrina Butler, 1882
 Asota tortuosa Moore, 1872
 Asota trinacria Semper, 1899
 Asota woodfordi Druce, 1888

References

 
 

 
Moth genera